Sohraj (also Romanized as Sohrej) is a village in Heruz Rural District, Kuhsaran District, Ravar County, Kerman Province, Iran. At the 2006 census, its population was 90, in 33 families.

References 

Populated places in Ravar County